Owen Delany Park is a multi-purpose sports stadium in Taupo, New Zealand.  The main sports played there are Rugby and cricket, though several other sports are accommodated on a permanent basis and numerous other events on a one-off basis.

History
The park is named for Owen Delany, who was a major figure in the Taupo sporting scene from 1953, when he formed the United Wanderers Cricket Club. In 1954 he reformed the Taupo Rugby Football club. The Taupo council named the new sports ground Owen Delany Park in recognition of the time and effort Delany had put into the establishment of the park and also his involvement in sport in Taupo over the previous thirty years. Delany attended the first One Day International held at the ground in 1999. In the 1995 Queen's Birthday Honours, Owen Delany was appointed a Member of the Order of the British Empire, for services to sport.

Ground
The park itself covers several hectares of land on the north-eastern outskirts of Taupo.  The main stadium contains a partially covered grandstand with 90 percent of the remaining perimeter formed as a raised grass embankment.  The playing surface contains a Rugby field with a cricket pitch in the centre and a grass athletics track forming the boundary.  A further two levels of grass surface provide up to five rugby fields and three artificial cricket pitches.

There is also an indoor stadium which houses a gymnastics facility, as well as an outdoor bitumen velodrome and outdoor netball courts. There are also a dog obedience facility and numerous sports club buildings in the park.

Usage

Primary
The King Country Rugby Union and the Northern Districts Cricket Association each use the ground several times a year for matches involving their premier teams and also use the facility for junior teams, training and development.

In 1994 King Country hosted the South African Rugby team in the first match of their tour of New Zealand.  This was South Africa's first game in New Zealand since the controversial 1981 tour.

In 1999, 2000 and 2001 the New Zealand cricket team played One Day International games at the park using the lights for the day-night fixtures.

For the past several seasons Owen Delany Park has played host to the Jock Hobbs Memorial National Under 19 Tournament (2014–present), it will continue to host the tournament until 2021

Secondary
Various local sports clubs utilise the park on a weekly and seasonal basis providing competition on local and national levels.

Several local rugby clubs use this as their home ground, including Taupo Marist, Taupo Sports and Taupo United.

The main stadium has been configured numerous times to host other sports such as association football, Rugby league and archery.  Concerts and other public and social events are also held at the ground when a larger sized venue is required.

International centuries
In the three ODIs that have been played at the venue one century has been scored.

References

External links 
 Owen Delany Park at Taupo District Council website 
 
 
 

Cricket grounds in New Zealand
Rugby union stadiums in New Zealand
Sports venues in Waikato
Sport in Taupō
1983 establishments in New Zealand
Sports venues completed in 1983